This is a list of submissions to the 73rd Academy Awards for Best Foreign Language Film. The Academy of Motion Picture Arts and Sciences has invited the film industries of various countries to submit their best film for the Academy Award for Best Foreign Language Film every year since the award was created in 1956. The award is handed out annually by the Academy to a feature-length motion picture produced outside the United States that contains primarily non-English dialogue. The Foreign Language Film Award Committee oversees the process and reviews all the submitted films.

For the 73rd Academy Awards, which were held on March 25, 2001, the Academy invited 75 countries to submit films for the Academy Award for Best Foreign Language Film. Forty-six countries submitted films to the Academy, including Ecuador, which submitted a film for the first time. The Academy released a list of the five nominees for the award on February 13, 2001. The winner of the Academy Award for Best Foreign Language Film was Taiwan's Crouching Tiger, Hidden Dragon, which was directed by Ang Lee.

Submissions

References
General

Specific

External links
Official website for the 73rd Academy Awards

73